Pananchery  is a village and gram panchayat in Thrissur district in the state of Kerala, India.
It is located along the National Highway ( NH47) from Thrissur to Palakkad.  Peechi, Pattikad, Kannara are located in Pananchery

Demographics
 India census, Pananchery had a population of 45963 with 22394 males and 23569 females.

Local government
Pananchery is the largest panchayath in the Thrissur district. It consists of 23 wards: Pananchery (village), Chembutra, Pattikkad, Thanippadam, Poovanchira, Chuvannamannu, Vanniyampara, Kombazha, Vazhakkumpara, Thekkumpadam, Edappalam, Mailuttumpara, Peechi, Thamaravellachal, Vilangannoor, Kannara, Veendassary, Payannam, Marakkal, Koottala, Alppara, Chirakkunnu and Mudikkode.

Places of interest
The Kerala Forest Research Institute (KFRI), the popular tourist spot of Peechi Dam and the Kerala Engineering Research Institute (KERI) are located in Pananchery. The Peechi reservoir supplies water to the Thrissur town besides providing water for irrigation to the region. Kannara plantain research centre Kannara. Two government higher secondary schools (Pattikkad GHSS and Peechi GHSS) are situated in this panchayath. Chief minister Mr.Pinarayi Vijayan inaugurated "Honey and Banana Park" on 23 September 2019

Education
 St. Alphonsa Public School, Pattikkad
Jeevan jyothi Public School, Thalikkode
 Teams College of IT and Management, Pananchery
 Kailasanadha Vidhya Nikethan, Mullakkara
Common Service Centre (Infotech Computer Centre)
 St. Marys Public School, Kombazha
Sree Badhra Vidhya Mandir, Chemboothra
Sree Narayana Guru College of Advanced Studies, Vazhukumpara

References

Villages in Thrissur district